Abdul Hai Kakar is a journalist who has worked as a BBC Urdu service correspondent in Peshawar, Pakistan.

Kakkar is responsible for unintentionally discovering Malala Yousafzai when, looking for a story, he asked her father, a school director, if any women at his school would be willing to write about living under the Taliban regime in Swat Valley. None agreed, so his daughter ended up doing it instead. Abdul Hai Kakar is currently working for RFE/RL's Radio Mashaal in Prague
</ref>

References

Living people
Place of birth missing (living people)
Year of birth missing (living people)
Pashtun people
Pakistani male journalists
BBC people